John Martin McDonnell (born 8 September 1951) is a British politician who served as Shadow Chancellor of the Exchequer from 2015 to 2020. A member of the Labour Party, he has been Member of Parliament (MP) for Hayes and Harlington since 1997.

McDonnell served as chair of the Socialist Campaign Group in Parliament and Labour Representation Committee; he also chaired the Public Services Not Private Profit Group. He is also parliamentary convenor of the Trade Union Co-ordinating Group of eight left-wing trade unions representing over half a million workers. McDonnell attempted to stand for the position of Labour Party leader following Tony Blair's resignation in 2007, but failed to get enough nominations. He was a candidate for the party leadership again in 2010 following Gordon Brown's resignation after Labour's electoral defeat, but withdrew in favour of Diane Abbott, feeling that he would be unable to secure enough nominations.

Alongside Jeremy Corbyn, McDonnell has been seen as a key figure on the left-wing of the party. After being elected Labour leader in 2015, Corbyn appointed McDonnell to his Shadow Cabinet as Shadow Chancellor of the Exchequer. As Shadow Chancellor, McDonnell pledged to increase spending on infrastructure and research, describing his vision for the economy as "socialism with an iPad".

Early life
McDonnell was born in Liverpool to a family with an Irish Catholic background. His father, Bob, was a docker who also served as a sergeant in the Sherwood Foresters during World War II, whilst his mother Elsie worked as a cleaner. He moved with his family to his mother's hometown, Great Yarmouth in Norfolk, when he was very young as his father was unable to find work at the docks; his father became a bus driver and was a branch secretary of the Transport and General Workers' Union and his mother worked for British Home Stores. McDonnell attended Great Yarmouth Grammar School. McDonnell received a Local Authority grant to attend St Joseph's College, Ipswich, a Roman Catholic boarding fee-paying independent school for boys (now co-educational). " McDonnell is now irreligious, but refers to himself as a "cultural Catholic" and is a regular churchgoer.

McDonnell failed his A-levels at grammar school, partly due to holding down part-time jobs in bars and a bingo hall. Upon leaving education, McDonnell held a series of unskilled jobs. After marrying his first wife, he returned to A-level studies at night school at Burnley Technical College, and at the age of 23, he moved to Hayes in Greater London, attended Brunel University, and earned a bachelor's degree in government and politics. During this period, he helped his wife run a small children's home in Hayes, and was active on behalf of his local community and for National Union of Public Employees. After completing his master's degree in politics and sociology at Birkbeck, University of London, he became a researcher and official with the National Union of Mineworkers from 1977 to 1978, and later the Trades Union Congress from 1978 until 1982. From 1985 to 1987, McDonnell was head of the policy unit at Camden Borough Council, then chief executive of the Association of London Authorities from 1987 to 1995, and the Association of London Government from 1995 until 1997.

Greater London Council (1981–1986)
In 1981, McDonnell was elected to the Greater London Council (GLC) as the member for Hayes and Harlington. He became the GLC's chair of finance and deputy leader to Ken Livingstone, who described him as having an "absolute grasp for detail and every year he produced a balanced budget, no borrowing". He was sacked by Ken Livingstone in 1985 over the strategy to oppose rate-capping—Prime Minister Margaret Thatcher's government had capped council rates (now called council tax), an action which the GLC had claimed, based on figures calculated by McDonnell, would lead to £135 million in cuts. However, Livingstone claimed in his autobiography to have found that the authority could actually still increase spending and cap the rates; Livingstone said that McDonnell had 'exaggerated' spending figures to support his case that the GLC had to ignore the rates cap, and that he confronted McDonnell, saying "If these figures are right we’re going to look like the biggest fucking liars since Goebbels." McDonnell described Livingstone's account as "complete fiction".

In an interview with Ronan Bennett for The Guardian newspaper, he described his role during this time as being "to translate policies into concrete realities on the ground." He further discussed his performance by indicating, "I was a fairly hard-nosed administrator. We set in train policies for which we were attacked from all sides but are now accepted as mainstream: large-scale investment in public services; raising the issue of Ireland and arguing for a dialogue for peace; equal opportunities; police accountability. We set up a women's committee, an ethnic minorities committee."

After the GLC (1986–1997)
Following the abolition of the GLC in 1986, McDonnell was employed as head of the policy unit at Camden London Borough Council. In 1987, he became Chief Executive of the Association of London Authorities (eventually the Association of London Government), where he represented all the London boroughs in their relations with central government and Europe. Having previously unsuccessfully contested Hampstead and Highgate in 1983, McDonnell fought for his home constituency of Hayes and Harlington at the 1992 general election, but lost by 53 votes, after three recounts, to the Conservative incumbent, Terry Dicks. During the campaign, Dicks sued for libel over critical material in McDonnell's campaign leaflets; McDonnell settled and paid Dicks damages of £15,000 plus legal costs of £55,000. McDonnell would later refer to Dicks as a 'stain' on the character of the House of Commons and a stain on the Conservative Party, and a 'malignant creature' during his maiden parliamentary speech.

Parliamentary backbencher (1997–2015)
When Terry Dicks then stood down, McDonnell became the MP for Hayes and Harlington at the 1997 general election, with 62 per cent of the vote and a majority of over 14,000. He made his maiden speech in the House of Commons on 6 June 1997, where he notably launched a scathing attack against his predecessor, against parliamentary tradition. He has been involved in several local community campaigns, including one opposing the expansion of Heathrow Airport and its impact on local communities. He opposed New Labour policies of the Iraq War, foundation hospitals, student top-up fees, trust schools and anti-terror laws. When Ken Livingstone was elected Mayor of London, as an independent in 2000, he appointed McDonnell to his cabinet with responsibility for local government in London.

Iraq War
McDonnell voted against the 2003 Iraq War, stating in 2007: In October 2006, McDonnell was one of 12 Labour MPs to back Plaid Cymru and the Scottish National Party's call for a parliamentary inquiry into the war in Iraq.

Irish Republican Army
In May 2003, he made controversial comments about the Provisional Irish Republican Army (IRA), saying:

Threatened with expulsion from the Labour Party, he went on to offer a rationale for his comments in an article written for The Guardian in June 2003 ("Expulsion would be an odd reward for telling hard truths"), stating:

According to a report in The Times published in November 2015, McDonnell had made similar comments at a Labour Committee on Ireland meeting in 1985, before the start of the Northern Ireland peace process. The Deptford Mercury asserted at the time that McDonnell had suggested there was a role for "the ballot, the bullet and the bomb" in achieving a United Ireland, and joked about "kneecapping" the "gutless wimp" Labour councillors who had declined to join the meeting.

In September 2015, McDonnell apologised on the BBC television programme Question Time for any offence caused by his remarks on the IRA. He said that his remarks in 2003 had been an attempt to persuade republicans to support the peace process and to afford the IRA the opportunity to disarm without humiliation stating: "There was a real risk of the Republican movement splitting and some of them continuing the armed process."

In his study at Hayes, McDonnell has a plaque presented to him by Gerry Kelly dedicated to the "H-Block Martyrs 1981", referring to those who died during the 1981 Irish hunger strike. A spokesman for McDonnell said the plaque "merely commemorates the peaceful protest in prison, not the prior actions of those involved".

Groups and campaigns in Parliament
McDonnell is a leading member of several all-party groups within Parliament, including groups representing individual trade unions, such as the Public and Commercial Services Union (PCS), the National Union of Rail, Maritime and Transport Workers (RMT), the Fire Brigades Union (FBU), the National Union of Journalists (NUJ) and justice unions such as NAPO. He is also a leading member of groups on a wide range of issues such as Britain's Irish community, the Punjabi community, endometriosis, and Kenya. McDonnell is a member of the Labour Land Campaign, which advocates introducing a land value tax.

McDonnell chairs the Labour Representation Committee (LRC), a left-wing group of Labour activists, local parties, trade unions and MPs that campaigns for the adoption of a raft of socialist policies by the Labour Government. The group was founded on Saturday, 3 July 2004, and currently has more than 800 members and 90 affiliates. He also chairs the Public Services Not Private Profit, an anti-privatisation campaign that brings together sixteen trade unions and several campaigning organisations, such as the World Development Movement, Defend Council Housing and the National Pensioners Convention. An early day motion in support of the campaign attracted more than ninety MPs. The campaign held a mass rally and lobby of Parliament on 27 June 2006, which was attended by more than 2,000 trade unionists.

Economic policy
In 2006, McDonnell said that "Marx, Lenin and Trotsky" were his "most significant" intellectual influences. Footage emerged of McDonnell in 2013 talking about the financial crisis of 2007–2008 and stating, "I've been waiting for this for a generation! We’ve got to demand systemic change. Look, I’m straight, I’m honest with people: I’m a Marxist." He was accused of celebrating the financial crisis of 2007–2008; McDonnell denied the allegation and claimed he was "joking". During an interview with Andrew Marr when the footage was played and McDonnell was asked, "Are you a Marxist?", he replied: "I believe there's a lot to learn from reading Kapital, yes of course there is, and that's been recommended not just by me but many others, mainstream economists as well." In 2018, McDonnell attended the Marx 200 conference, where he said, "Marxism is about the freedom of spirit, the development of life chances, the enhancement of democracy." In 2019, McDonnell during an interview stated that Marx’s Kapital is "one of the important analyses of the modern capitalist system".

Public services
McDonnell has consistently opposed the privatisation of public services and chaired the Public Services not Private Profit Campaign launched in 2006 and supported by sixteen trade unions linking up with students, pensioners, health campaigners and the World Development Movement.

McDonnell is "not supportive of PFI schemes", declaring that he has "opposed every PFI scheme that was proposed". In 2006, during the parliamentary debate on the Budget Resolutions, McDonnell warned against public-private finance initiatives (PFIs), calling for an inquiry:There are numerous examples. I refer hon. Members to the work of Alison Pollock and to the publications by Unison in recent months, which contain example after example in the public services, health and education where PFI has been used to exploit the public purse, has failed to deliver and has delivered large bonuses and profits to individual company directors. That is why I regret that the Chancellor is going along that line. I would welcome a Government inquiry into PFI, which would probably echo the work done by the Public Accounts Committee on individual PFI schemes, which has demonstrated their lack of deliverability and cost effectiveness.

Tax transparency
Throughout his time in Parliament, McDonnell has championed the cause of tax justice, hosting the Parliamentary launch of the Tax Justice Network in 2003.

In 2002, McDonnell worked with William Campbell-Taylor and Maurice Glasman, who challenged a parliamentary bill concerned with the City of London Corporation in relation to alleged tax avoidance:Apart from a couple of brave, independent-minded Labour MPs, notably John McDonnell, nobody supported Glasman and Campbell-Taylor to challenge the bill. Such is the fear that the corporation inspires in parliament.

Bank regulations
During the 2011 Budget Resolutions, McDonnell highlighted his long-term consistent work calling for better regulation of the banking and finance sector:We seem to forget that the cause of that crisis was the cause of this crisis—speculation by the banks and other speculators and, yes, a Government who failed to regulate. I have to say, however, that when a number of Members called for bank regulation in this House, there was an element of quietude on all sides. I remember fighting for four years, in almost a solitary capacity, to secure the passage of the City of London (Ward Elections) Bill at a time when we were pressing for regulation.

Anti-austerity
In February 2013, McDonnell was among those who supported the People's Assembly Against Austerity in a letter published by The Guardian newspaper.

Heathrow Airport expansion

McDonnell has been a vocal opponent of plans to expand Heathrow Airport with a third runway—the proposed site lies within his constituency. During a debate on the expansion of the airport on 15 January 2009, he was suspended for five days by Deputy Speaker Alan Haselhurst after disrupting Commons proceedings. McDonnell picked up the ceremonial mace and placed it down on an empty bench in the Commons while shouting that the lack of a vote on the third runway was "a disgrace to the democracy of this country."

Armed police and MI5
In 2015, McDonnell's name appeared on a letter calling for the armed police and MI5 to be disbanded. He claimed that he had not signed the letter, which was produced by the Socialist Campaign for a Labour Victory (SCLV), but he was photographed holding a copy of the letter, although he later said that he did not know that the demand was on the letter.

2007 Labour leadership campaign

On 14 July 2006, McDonnell announced his intention to stand for leadership of the Labour Party when Tony Blair announced the date of his resignation. He called for "a challenge to the present political consensus", and, "a real Labour government based upon the policies that our supporters expect from us". McDonnell said he would like to see a return to the Labour Party's more traditional areas.

Initially, McDonnell and Michael Meacher were the two candidates representing the left wing of the party. McDonnell's campaign concentrated on grassroots efforts, which earned him an endorsement from the Trades Union Congress. In a YouGov opinion poll of more than 1,100 Labour Party members asking their preferred choice in the leadership contest, McDonnell received 9% support, and was ranked second to Chancellor Gordon Brown, who led with 80% of the vote. Declared supporters included Diane Abbott, Tony Benn, and Ann Cryer. In total, eleven Labour MPs declared their support on McDonnell's campaign website.

Labour Party rules require candidates to be nominated by 12.5% of Labour MPs (45 out of a total of 355 in 2007). Gordon Brown received 313 (88.2%) nominations, while McDonnell failed to collect the 45 nominations required to proceed to the Electoral College. As the only nominated candidate, Gordon Brown was declared leader by the NEC.

2010 Labour leadership campaign

On 18 May 2010, news broke that McDonnell wanted to stand in the Labour Party leadership election, to be held following the resignation of Gordon Brown, and would announce it the following day at the Public and Commercial Services Union conference in Brighton. McDonnell noted that it would be "difficult" to get the 33 nominations needed from the Parliamentary Labour Party required to stand in the election.

During a hustings for the GMB Union on 7 June, McDonnell was asked what single act he would do to improve the world if he could travel back to the 1980s. His off-the-cuff reply was that "I was on the GLC that Mrs. Thatcher abolished, I worked for the NUM and we had the NUM strike, I think I would assassinate Thatcher". Conservative MP Conor Burns told the BBC that "[it was] very distasteful" and "a very silly remark". McDonnell told the BBC: "I'm sorry if I have caused offence to anyone. It was a joke and in that audience it was taken as a joke ... it was taken out of context, I can see if people are upset about that and if I have caused offence to anyone of course I apologise".

By 9 June 2010, the deadline for nominations, he had secured only 16 nominations and withdrew from the contest.

Shadow Chancellor of the Exchequer (2015–2020)

McDonnell was one of the thirty-six Labour MPs to nominate Jeremy Corbyn (who was elected as Labour leader with 59.5% of the vote) as a candidate in the Labour leadership election of 2015. McDonnell managed Corbyn's leadership campaign, and he was appointed Shadow Chancellor in September 2015.

In an article in The Guardian in the previous month, he set out the economic principles that a Corbyn government would follow:

McDonnell's first speech as Shadow Chancellor was at the 2015 Labour Party conference in Brighton. In the speech, he set out Labour's thinking and priorities in key areas, as well as encouraging Labour MPs who had refused to serve under Corbyn to return.

He surprised many by calling upon Labour MPs to back Conservative Chancellor George Osborne's Fiscal Charter, arguing that supporting the proposed deficit reduction framework showed Labour's commitment to "living within their means." However, he reversed that call in October, citing his trip to visit former steelworkers at a recently closed plant in Redcar as the reason for not wanting to be associated with supporting government cuts. McDonnell repeated the word "embarrassing" five times in his Commons response to the U-turn, adding that "a bit of humility amongst politicians never goes amiss".

In a November speech ahead of Osborne's Spending Review, McDonnell pledged that a Labour government would spend 3.5% of GDP on infrastructure and fund research through an Innovation Policy Council, describing his vision for the economy as "socialism with an iPad".

McDonnell has explored ideas surrounding "alternative models of ownership", publishing a report on the subject in June 2017 and hosting a discussion conference in London in February 2018. The report sets out the "practicality and necessity of a shift to a variety of alternative forms of ownership and control of productive enterprises, including co-operatives, municipal and locally-led ownership forms, and ... new democratic forms of national ownership".

During his response to the 2015 Autumn Statement in which he accused George Osborne of "sheer economic illiteracy", McDonnell highlighted that the government was "selling off at least £5,000,000,000 worth of our own assets" to foreign investors, emphasising China. To make this point he quoted from a copy of Chairman Mao Zedong's Little Red Book and then threw it across the despatch box towards the Conservative front bench. A clearly amused Chancellor Osborne, responded by quipping that it was McDonnell's own signed copy.

On 29 September 2016, he was appointed to the Privy Council of the United Kingdom and may therefore use the title The Right Honourable.

In the aftermath of the Grenfell Tower fire, McDonnell said those who died in it were "murdered" by political decisions, arguing "The decision to close fire stations and to cut 10,000 fire fighters and then to freeze their pay for over a decade contributed to those deaths inevitably". The use of the word "murder" was questioned by some of his colleagues as well as the Conservative Party, with Jim Fitzpatrick, leader of the All-Party Parliamentary Group on Fire Safety suggesting it was "premature" to draw conclusions about what caused the deaths.

McDonnell said that Grenfell "symbolised for many everything that's gone wrong in this country since austerity was imposed upon us" and used it to highlight pay cuts across the public sector, arguing that Conservatives praise the emergency services "every time there's a tragedy" while cutting jobs and wages.

McDonnell sparked controversy when he joked that Conservative politician Esther McVey should be lynched and described her as a "stain on humanity." He said that he was quoting a constituent speaking at a public meeting convened to oppose McVey's policies on benefits and did not endorse the sentiment. The Leader of the House of Commons, Andrea Leadsom, called the remark "truly evil."

In 2017, McDonnell said: "I will be the first socialist Labour Chancellor". McDonnell in his Who’s Who entry posted one of his hobbies as "fermenting [sic] the overthrow of capitalism". In 2018, McDonnell said that he "wants to "overthrow capitalism" and replace it with a "socialist society"". He also said Venezuela's economic problems were because it was no longer a socialist country.

In September 2018, McDonnell said he would only back a second referendum on the European Union if the option to remain is not present. He also agreed with shadow international trade secretary Barry Gardiner, when he suggested a second referendum could lead to social unrest.

In February 2019, McDonnell sparked controversy when he referred to the former Prime Minister Winston Churchill as a "villain." Writing on Twitter, Boris Johnson said: "JM should be utterly ashamed of his remarks and withdraw them forthwith."

During a comprehensive interview conducted by former Labour Party member Alastair Campbell for British GQ in October 2019, McDonnell stated his disapproval of the former's expulsion from the party and indicated he would support his return. He also expressed his own view that the next party leader should be female, and that the party should employ positive discrimination to aid that prospect if Jeremy Corbyn were to lose the next general election. When asked to name any current Tory politician whom he respected, he declined, subsequently stating that he "can't forgive any of them". Campbell followed up by asking the same question about any historic Tories, to which McDonnell replied "No".

Upon the election of Keir Starmer as Leader of the Labour Party, McDonnell stood down as Shadow Chancellor and was succeeded by Anneliese Dodds.

Return to the backbenches (2020–present) 
In February 2020, McDonnell met with Julian Assange at HM Prison Belmarsh.

He is running a campaign to pass a motion supporting proportional representation at the 2022 Labour Party conference after it failed in 2021 due to a lack of trade union support.

On 24 February 2022, following the 2022 Russian invasion of Ukraine, McDonnell was one of 11 Labour MPs threatened with losing the party whip after they signed a statement by the Stop the War Coalition which questioned the legitimacy of NATO and accused the military alliance of "eastward expansion". All 11 MPs subsequently removed their signatures. McDonnell subsequently joined calls for increased arms supplies to Ukraine and criticized those on the left who opposed it.

Personal life
McDonnell has two daughters from his first marriage, which ended in 1985, and a son from his second marriage to Cynthia Pinto in 1995.

In 2013, McDonnell suffered a heart attack and was forced to take time off work.

While raised as a Roman Catholic and attending a minor seminary, McDonnell now identifies as an atheist. Despite this McDonnell still respects the Church and acknowledges that he owes a "debt" to it for shaping his politics, later saying "The values of Catholicism are the inherent values of the Labour Party and the inherent values of socialism..."

See also
Economics for the Many
Labour Representation Committee
Socialist Campaign Group

References

External links

John McDonnell MP official constituency website

Website at ePolitix
Public Services Not Private Profit

Historical

John4Leader official 2007 Leader campaign website
John McDonnell, Labour MP for Hayes & Harlington official 2010 Leader campaign website

Speech by John McDonnell during Modern Slavery Bill debate in the House of Commons

|-

1951 births
Living people
Alumni of Birkbeck, University of London
Alumni of Brunel University London
British anti-capitalists
British Marxists
British religious sceptics
British socialists
British women's rights activists
European democratic socialists
English Marxists
English anti-fascists
English anti–Iraq War activists
English people of Irish descent
English republicans
English socialists
Labour Party (UK) MPs for English constituencies
Left-wing politics in the United Kingdom
Members of the Greater London Council
Members of the Privy Council of the United Kingdom
People educated at Great Yarmouth Grammar School
People educated at St Joseph's College, Ipswich
Politicians from Liverpool
UK MPs 1997–2001
UK MPs 2001–2005
UK MPs 2005–2010
UK MPs 2010–2015
UK MPs 2015–2017
UK MPs 2017–2019
UK MPs 2019–present
Universal basic income in the United Kingdom
Shadow Chancellors of the Exchequer